Carroll Augustine Devol (April 17, 1859 - June 3, 1930) was a major general in the United States Army who killed himself in 1930.

Biography
He was born on April 17, 1859 in Waterford, Ohio to Hiram Fosdick Devol (1831-1912) and Adelaide Amanda Dyar (1837-1860). He married Isadora Scott Devol (1861-1950). Their daughter, Mary Adelaide Devol, married George H. Brett on 1 March 1916.

He was a second lieutenant for the 25th Infantry Regiment on September 1, 1879; first lieutenant on October 19, 1886; regimental quartermaster April 1, 1887 to April 19, 1891.

In 1895 he was a professor of Military Science and Tactics at the University of Wisconsin.

He was captain assistant quartermaster August 21, 1896; major quartermaster volunteers October 17, 1898; lieutenant colonel quartermaster assigned February 6, 1899 to March 2, 1899; honorable discharged from volunteers May 1, 1901; major quartermaster May 5, 1902. Chief quartermaster in 1903.

He was Quartermaster at the Presidio of San Francisco during the 1906 San Francisco earthquake and was in charge of the distribution of military and civil supplies to refugees from the disaster.

He killed himself with a gunshot through his heart on June 3, 1930 at his home in Redwood City, California after learning of his terminal diagnosis from stomach cancer.

References

External links

Suicides by firearm in California
1859 births
1930 deaths
United States Army generals
People from Waterford, Ohio
People from Redwood City, California
Military personnel from California